James Wainaina Macharia (born 1959) is a Kenyan accountant who was nominated by President Uhuru Kenyatta as Cabinet Secretary for transport in November 2015.He replaced in acting capacity Michael kamau  who was suspended in March  2015. Before that he was the cabinet secretary for health. 
.

References

F

1959 births
Kenyan accountants
University of Nairobi alumni
Alumni of the University of Reading
Living people